James Baird State Park is a  state park in Dutchess County, New York, United States.  The park is located in the northern part of the Town of LaGrange, east of City of Poughkeepsie.

History
The park is named after James Baird (engineer and president of the George A. Fuller Company, a construction company), the donor of the land.  Baird, who held a Ph.D. in engineering,  formed the construction company that erected the Lincoln Memorial and the Folger Shakespeare Library.  He donated his land to the state in 1939 for a park.

The park formerly included a large community swimming pool, which was filled in by park management in the 1980s. Today, the bathhouse serves as a restroom and concession building has been demolished. The former pool area is bounded by rows of large elm trees.

Description
James Baird State Park offers picnic tables with pavilions, a playground, recreation programs, hiking and biking, a nature trail, cross-country skiing, and a food concession. A sports complex that offers pickleball, softball, volleyball, basketball, and tennis is also included in the park, in addition to the 18-hole James Baird State Park Golf Course.

See also

List of New York state parks

References

External links

 New York State Parks: James Baird State Park
 New York-New Jersey Trail Conference: James Baird State Park

State parks of New York (state)
Parks in Dutchess County, New York